Robert Currie Graham (25 August 1900 – 1965) was a Scottish footballer who played in the Football League for Luton Town, Norwich City and Thames.

References

1900 births
1965 deaths
Scottish footballers
Association football defenders
English Football League players
Kilwinning Rangers F.C. players
Luton Town F.C. players
Norwich City F.C. players
Thames A.F.C. players
Bedford Town F.C. players